Mirgorodsky Uyezd (Миргородский уезд) was one of the subdivisions of the Poltava Governorate of the Russian Empire. It was situated in the central part of the governorate. Its administrative centre was Mirgorod (Myrhorod).

Demographics
At the time of the Russian Empire Census of 1897, Mirgorodsky Uyezd had a population of 157,790. Of these, 97.1% spoke Ukrainian, 1.9% Yiddish and 0.9% Russian as their native language.

References

 
Uezds of Poltava Governorate
Poltava Governorate